Helmer is an unincorporated community in Latah County, Idaho, United States.

History
Helmer was founded when the railroad was extended to that point. A post office was established at Helmer in 1907, and remained in operation until 1929.

Helmer's population was estimated at 50 in 1909, and was 30 in 1960.

References

Unincorporated communities in Latah County, Idaho
Unincorporated communities in Idaho